Listronotus distinctus is a species of underwater weevil in the family Curculionidae.  It is found in North America.

References

Further reading

 
 
 
 
 
 

Cyclominae
Beetles described in 1940